Morten Beck Guldsmed (born 2 January 1988) is a Danish professional football player.

References

External links

Hobro ophæver med Beck Andersen, bold.dk, 1 February 2016
Islandsk klub snupper Beck Andersen‚ bold.dk, 5 February 2016
Morten Beck at Viborg FF 

1988 births
Living people
Danish men's footballers
Association football midfielders
Aarhus Gymnastikforening players
Skive IK players
Silkeborg IF players
Hobro IK players
Knattspyrnufélag Reykjavíkur players
FC Fredericia players
Viborg FF players
Fimleikafélag Hafnarfjarðar players
Danish Superliga players
Danish 1st Division players
Úrvalsdeild karla (football) players
Danish expatriate men's footballers
Danish expatriate sportspeople in Iceland
Expatriate footballers in Iceland
Íþróttabandalag Akraness players